The 2011 theme for the Europa coin programme is European Explorers. The subject must have been a European or to have conducted exploration on behalf of a European nation. At least 7 European countries are participating:

See also

Eurosystem
Euro
Euro gold and silver commemorative coins

External links
National mints in the EU

References

Coins of the Eurozone
Euro commemorative coins